HMS Thunderer was one of two  turret ships built for the Royal Navy in the 1870s. She suffered two serious accidents before the decade was out and gained a reputation as an unlucky ship for several years afterward. The ship was assigned to the Mediterranean Fleet in 1878 and was reduced to reserve in 1881 before being recommissioned in 1885. Thunderer returned home in 1887 and was again placed in reserve. She rejoined the Mediterranean Fleet in 1891, but was forced to return to the UK by boiler problems the following year. The ship became a coast guard ship in Wales in 1895 and was again placed in reserve in 1900. Thunderer was taken out of service in 1907 and sold for scrap in 1909.

Background and description

The Devastation class was designed as an enlarged, ocean-going, version of the earlier . The Devastation-class ships displaced . Their crew consisted of 358 officers and ratings. They proved to be steady gun platforms and good seaboats, albeit quite wet forward. Their low forecastle caused them problems with head seas and limited their speed in such conditions.

Thunderer had two Humphry & Tennant two-cylinder horizontal direct-acting steam engines using steam provided by eight rectangular boilers; each engine driving a single propeller.

[[File:Thunderer turret - King 1875.png|thumb|left|Thunderer'''s forward turret, as first constructed with manual ramming]]
The Devastation class was armed with four RML  rifled muzzle-loading guns, one pair in each of the gun turrets positioned fore and aft of the superstructure. Shortly after completion, Thunderers forward turret's weapons were replaced by more powerful RML  guns.Hodges, p. 13

While both gun turrets were rotated by steam power, the new forward guns were loaded by hydraulic power, unlike the original guns which were hand worked. Thunderer was the first ship to have hydraulic loading gear. From 1874, the forward turret alone was converted to hydraulic power operation for training (turret traverse), elevation and ramming. This allowed the turret crew to be reduced from 48 to 28; the aft turret remaining hand-worked as a comparison. Power operation was considered successful, although it was later implicated in the 1879 explosion.

The Devastation-class ships had a complete wrought iron waterline armour belt that was 12 inches thick amidships and tapered to  outside the armoured citadel towards the ends of the ship. The armoured citadel protected the bases of the gun turrets, the funnel uptakes and the crew's quarters. The sides of the citadel were 12 inches thick around the bases of the turrets and 10 inches thick elsewhere. The turrets were protected by two  plates, separated by a layer of teak with the turret face having the thicker armour. The magazine were protected by a 6-inch forward bulkhead and a  one aft. The conning tower ranged in thickness from 9 to 6 inches in thickness.

Construction and careerThunderer, the fifth ship of her name to serve in the Royal Navy, was laid down on 26 June 1869 at Pembroke Dockyard, Wales. Construction was subsequently halted for a time in 1871 to modify the ship to improve her stability and buoyancy by extending the breastwork to cover the full width of the hull which increased the ship's freeboard amidships and provided additional accommodation for the crew. The ship was launched on 25 March 1872 by Mrs. Mary Meyrick, wife of Thomas Meyrick, MP. Two years later she was transferred to Portsmouth Dockyard to finish fitting out.

On 14 July 1876, Thunderer suffered a disastrous boiler explosion which killed 45 people. One of her boilers burst as she proceeded from Portsmouth Harbour to Stokes Bay to carry out a full-power trial. The explosion killed 15 people instantly, including her commanding officer; around 70 others were injured, of whom 30 later died. This was the Royal Navy's most deadly boiler explosion through the whole century. A model representing the failed boiler was made and is now in the Science Museum, London. The explosion was caused because a pressure gauge was broken and the safety valve had corroded in place. When the steam stop valve to the engines was closed, pressure in the boiler rose and could not be released. The boiler was repaired and the ship was completed on 26 May 1877 at a cost of £368,428.Thunderer was commissioned in May 1877 for service with the Reserve Fleet Particular Service Squadron and was then assigned to the Channel Squadron. During this time, she was fitted with experimental  torpedoes. She sailed for the Mediterranean in 1878 under the command of Captain Alfred Chatfield. Leaving Gibraltar for Malta in November 1878, Thunderer ran aground and was damaged. She was refloated and resumed her voyage. She was repaired at Malta.

The ship suffered another serious accident on 2 January 1879, when the left 12-inch 38 ton gun in the forward turret exploded during gunnery practice in the Sea of Marmora, killing 11 and injuring a further 35. The muzzle-loading gun had been double-loaded following a misfire. According to Admiral of the Fleet E.H Seymour,

"Both turret guns were being fired simultaneously, and evidently one did not go off. It may seem hard to believe such a thing could happen and not be noticed, but from my own experience I understand it. The men in the turret often stopped their ears, and perhaps their eyes, at the moment of firing, and then instantly worked the run-in levers, and did not notice how much the guns had recoiled. This no doubt occurred. Both guns were at once reloaded, and the rammer's indicator, working by machinery, set fast and failed to show how far the new charge had gone."

The accident contributed to the Royal Navy changing to breech-loading guns, which could be more conveniently worked from inside the turrets. The fragments of the destroyed gun were re-assembled and displayed to the public at the Woolwich Arsenal. The committee of inquiry decided that the gun had been double-loaded, but this view was widely questioned, including by Sir William Palliser, designer of the Palliser shell used by these guns. Palliser's view instead was that the shot had been obstructed by a portion of the millboard disc rammed above the shell. Hydraulic power-ramming was thought to be implicated in the double loading as the telescopic hydraulic rammer had not made the double loading obvious, as a manual ramrod would have done. One piece of evidence supporting the double loading theory was the presence of an additional stud torn from a Palliser shell, found amongst the wreckage within the turret. She was repaired at Malta. Thunderer was then regarded as an unlucky ship and was placed in reserve at Malta in 1881 and had her machinery overhauled. Her armament was augmented with a pair of  torpedo launchers and a half-dozen 1-inch (25 mm) Nordenfelt guns on the hurricane deck. She was recommissioned in 1885 and remained with the Mediterranean Fleet until she was paid off at Chatham Dockyard. The future King George V served aboard Thunderer in 1885–86.

The ship was assigned to the Portsmouth Reserve in January 1888 before beginning a major modernisation the following year. Her guns were replaced by four breech-loading 10-inch guns. To improve her defence against torpedo boats, her Nordenfelt guns were replaced by six quick-firing (QF) 6-pounder  and eight QF 3-pounder  Hotchkiss guns. Thunderers machinery was replaced by inverted triple-expansion steam engines and cylindrical boilers.

The ship rejoined the Mediterranean Fleet in March 1891, but was forced to return home in September 1892 with persistent boiler problems and she was reduced to the Chatham reserve. Thunderer became the guard ship at Pembroke Dock in May 1895 and remained there until she returned to the Chatham reserve in December 1900. The ship was refitted there as an emergency ship in 1902, but was taken out of service five years later. Thunderer was sold for scrap for £19,500 on 13 September 1909.

The Devastation'' class became more popular among the civilian population and in the Royal Navy as the ships got older. Give me the Thunderer, the hull of the Thunderer; she had bad engines, she was not arranged as I would like inside, she was badly gunned as we all know, and she had not enough light gun or sufficient armaments; but she carried  of coal, could steam at 10 knots from here to the Cape, and could fight any ship of her class on the salt water."

Notes

References

External links

 Details of Boiler Explosion on HMS Thunderer – a contemporary newspaper account of the incident
 Accidents on HMS Thunderer

 

Devastation-class ironclads
Ships built in Pembroke Dock
1872 ships
Victorian-era battleships of the United Kingdom
Maritime boiler explosions
Maritime incidents in July 1876
Maritime incidents in November 1878
Maritime incidents in January 1879